The Fatherland League was a Dutch liberal / reactionary political party founded in 1924.

The party was founded on November 15, 1924, by members of various (conservative) liberal groups, by initiative of J.A.A.H. de Beaufort and R.A. Fockema. Its initial members were industrialist, lawyers, civil servants, and politicians, like Samuel van Houten.

After the party obtained a disastrous result in the 1925 Dutch elections, the League started negotiations with the Verbond van Actualisten, a fascist party. Most of the liberals would have left the party by 1926 though.

On June 12, 1926, the party would be reinstituted as The Fatherland League, when the last remaining members of the Fatherland League merged with the faction de Jong of the Verbond van Actualisten.

Defunct political parties in the Netherlands